Nowa Studnica  (German: Neu Stüdnitz) is a village in the administrative district of Gmina Tuczno, within Wałcz County, West Pomeranian Voivodeship, in north-western Poland.

The village has a population of 30.

Before 1945 the village was German-settled and part of the German state of Prussia.

References

Nowa Studnica